Jordan Turner-Hall (born 5 January 1988 in London, England) is a former rugby union player for Harlequin F.C. in the Aviva Premiership, playing primarily as a centre but he could also play on the wing.

His first start for England came on 30 May 2009 against the Barbarians.

He spent his younger days playing American football with the likes of Nick Ashburn and Charlie Canrac, who both went on to play professionally for the Miami Dolphins. Turner-Hall was known as 'The Bull' in his football playing days, and it is his hefty frame that can at times make him one of the most brutal attacking forces in the Premiership today. Honours such as representing Harlequins 1st XV at 17 years old, and playing for the England under 20s on a regular basis, have already come before him.

He started for Harlequins in their 2011–12 Premiership final victory over Leicester Tigers.

References

External links
Harlequins profile
England profile

1988 births
Living people
Black British sportspeople
England international rugby union players
English rugby union players
Rugby union centres
Rugby union players from London